Guys Write for Guys Read is a compilation of essays for the Guys Read organization.  Edited by children's book author Jon Scieszka, it contains contributions from Lloyd Alexander, Christopher Paolini, Ned Vizzini, James Howe, Mo Willems, Jack Gantos, Stephen King, Neil Gaiman, and other male children's and young adult authors.

References

2005 non-fiction books
2005 anthologies
Essay anthologies
Young adult anthologies
American anthologies